Nikita Shchitov (born December 24, 1983) is a Russian former professional ice hockey defenceman who last played for HC Sochi in the Kontinental Hockey League (KHL). He formerly played with Salavat Yulaev Ufa, Neftekhimik Nizhnekamsk, HC Spartak Moscow and HC Sochi in Russia's top tier leagues.

Shchitov ended his 15-year professional career after missing the entirety of the 2019–20 season due to injury. He finished his career as captain of HC Sochi, having played parts of four seasons with the club and leading the club in games played and points among defenseman.

References

External links

1983 births
Living people
Avtomobilist Yekaterinburg players
HC Neftekhimik Nizhnekamsk players
Russian ice hockey defencemen
Salavat Yulaev Ufa players
HC Sochi players
HC Spartak Moscow players
Sportspeople from Ufa